Eulânio Ângelo Chipela Gomes (born 17 May 1994) known as Nanu, is a professional footballer who plays for Santa Clara on loan from Porto as a winger or as a right-back. Born in Portugal, he represents the Guinea-Bissau national team.

Club career
On 27 July 2013, Nanu made his professional debut with Beira-Mar in a 2013–14 Taça da Liga match against Portimonense, replacing Tiago Cintra (80th minute). In the first match of the 2013–14 Segunda Liga season against FC Porto B on the 12 August, he made his league debut.

On 10 January 2022, Nanu moved on a season-long loan to Major League Soccer club FC Dallas. Following the 2022 season, Nanu's contract option was declined by Dallas.

On 31 January 2023, Nanu was loaned by Santa Clara.

International career
Nanu made his Guinea-Bissau national team debut on 8 June 2019 in a friendly against Angola, as a starter. He represented the national team at the 2019 Africa Cup of Nations.

Career statistics

Club

International goals
Scores and results list Guinea-Bissau's goal tally first.

References

External links

Stats and profile at LPFP

1994 births
Sportspeople from Coimbra
Citizens of Guinea-Bissau through descent
Portuguese sportspeople of Bissau-Guinean descent
Living people
Bissau-Guinean footballers
Guinea-Bissau international footballers
Portuguese footballers
Association football forwards
S.C. Beira-Mar players
FC Porto players
FC Dallas players
C.D. Santa Clara players
Primeira Liga players
Liga Portugal 2 players
Major League Soccer players
2019 Africa Cup of Nations players
Bissau-Guinean expatriate footballers
Expatriate soccer players in the United States
Bissau-Guinean expatriate sportspeople in the United States